First Lady of Moldova is an informal title applied to the wife of the President of Moldova.

First ladies of Moldova (since 1991) 

 Georgeta Snegur (September 3, 1990 – January 15, 1997)
 Antonina Lucinschi (January 15, 1997 – April 7, 2001)
 Taisia Voronina (April 7, 2001 – September 11, 2009)
 Dina Ghimpu (September 11, 2009 – December 28, 2010)
 Sanda Filat (December 28, 2010 – December 30, 2010)
 Victoria Lupu (December 30, 2010 – March 23, 2012)
 Margareta Timofti (March 23, 2012 – December 23, 2016)
 Galina Dodon (December 23, 2016 – December 24, 2020)

References 

First ladies and gentlemen of Moldova
Moldova